Frank G. Mancuso Jr. (born October 9, 1958) is an American film producer.

Mancuso, the son of the former Paramount Pictures president Frank Mancuso Sr., was born in Buffalo, New York. Mancuso produced sequels to Friday the 13th and co-created Friday the 13th: The Series.

Mancuso later produced Cool World, which he had heavily rewritten during production, Internal Affairs, the Species franchise, Hoodlum, Stigmata, Ronin, I Know Who Killed Me, Shorts and Road to Paloma.

Filmography
He was a producer in all films unless otherwise noted.

Film

As an actor

Location management

Television

As writer

References

External links

1958 births
Film producers from New York (state)
American people of Italian descent
Living people
Businesspeople from Buffalo, New York
Television producers from New York (state)